"Bewildered" is a popular song written in 1936 by Teddy Powell and Leonard Whitcup. It was a 1938 hit for Tommy Dorsey and His Orchestra.

1948 recordings 
The song was revived in the late 1940s when two different versions, by the Red Miller Trio and Amos Milburn, reached number one on the R&B chart in 1948 (neither of them made the pop chart). Both these versions departed significantly from the original published melody and influenced later recordings.

James Brown and the Famous Flames version

James Brown and the Famous Flames recorded "Bewildered" in 1959. Their doo-wop–tinged rendition was somewhat similar to the Amos Milburn version, with a strong triplet feeling and a heavily melismatic vocal line. It was first released as a track on Brown's 1960 album Think!. The following year it was issued as a single, which reached the R&B Top Ten and became Brown's second single (after "Think") to enter the pop Top 40 (US charts: number 8 R&B; number 40 pop).

"Bewildered" became a staple of Brown's concerts for much of his career. It was featured in a medley on his breakthrough 1963 album Live at the Apollo and appeared on several of his later live albums, including Revolution of the Mind: Recorded Live at the Apollo, Vol. III (1971) and Love, Power, Peace (1992). He also recorded new studio versions for the albums Prisoner of Love (1963) and Sex Machine (1970).

Personnel
 James Brown – lead vocal

And The Famous Flames:
 Louis Madison – vocals, piano
 Bobby Bennett – vocals
 Baby Lloyd Stallworth – vocals
 Johnny Terry – vocals
 Willie Johnson – vocals

with the James Brown Band:
 George Dorsey – alto saxophone
 J.C. Davis – tenor saxophone
 Bobby Roach – guitar
 Bernard Odum – bass guitar
 Nat Kendrick – drums

Other versions
"Bewildered" was subsequently recorded by several others, including R&B performers: 
Also in 1938, it was also recorded by Mildred Bailey.
Billy Eckstine and the Ink Spots, with Eckstine's version reaching number 4 on the R&B chart and number 27 on the pop chart. 
A decade later it was recorded by Mickey & Sylvia, again with an altered melody similar to that of the Red Miller Trio recording. 
"Bewildered" was also covered in 1990 by the Notting Hillbillies on their album Missing...Presumed Having a Good Time.

References

1936 songs
1948 singles
1949 singles
1958 singles
1961 singles
James Brown songs
The Famous Flames songs
Mickey & Sylvia songs
Songs written by Teddy Powell
Songs written by Leonard Whitcup
King Records (United States) singles